"I Need a Miracle" is a song by Christian contemporary Christian music Southern rock and Christian rock band Third Day from their eleventh studio album, Miracle. It was released on September 14, 2012, as the first single from the album.

Background 
This song was produced by Brendan O'Brien.

Composition 
"I Need a Miracle" was written by Mac Powell and his fellow band members in Third Day.

According to Powell the idea came from a post-concert meeting with a New Jersey couple.  They mentioned their son had been depressed and drove deep into the woods, planning to kill himself.  He turned on the radio and heard "Cry Out to Jesus" (from their 2005 album Wherever You Are), which gave him encouragement to keep going.

Release 
The song "I Need a Miracle" was digitally released as the lead single from Miracle on September 14, 2012.

Music video
The music video for the single "I Need a Miracle" was released on November 5, 2012. The video is based around the story in the lyrics. A boy leaves a suicide note on a desk before leaving in his truck. He drives to a wooded area. His mother reads the note and is in shock. The boy hears a song on the radio that gives him hope to keep him from ending his life. He returns home to embrace with his mother.

Charts

Weekly charts

Year-end charts

References 

2012 singles
Third Day songs
Song recordings produced by Brendan O'Brien (record producer)
Songs written by Mac Powell
2012 songs
Essential Records (Christian) singles